WBKV (89.9 FM) is a radio station in Buffalo, New York, broadcasting K-Love's contemporary Christian format without local deviation outside of station identification. It is owned by the Educational Media Foundation. Unlike most Buffalo stations, its signal is mostly audible only in the Southtowns, and has no over-the-air availability across Lake Ontario into the Greater Toronto Area; a weak signal and adjacent-channel interference from public radio stations WNJA and WPSX make the station inaudible in most of the western Southern Tier.

The station signed on in 1989 as WFBF under the ownership of Family Stations, carrying its Family Radio network. In September 2019, Family Stations came to terms with the Educational Media Foundation to sell four stations, including the then-WFBF, to that organization. Upon the sale's closing on November 22, 2019, the station became the Buffalo market's K-Love affiliate, and the station changed its call sign to WBKV.

References

External links

K-Love radio stations
Radio stations established in 1989
1989 establishments in New York (state)
Educational Media Foundation radio stations
BKV (FM)